Montes Cordillera is a mountain range on the Moon. This feature forms the outer wall of peaks that surround the Mare Orientale impact basin, the inner ring being formed by the Montes Rook.

This range of peaks lies across the southwestern limb of the Moon, so that they are observed from the side from Earth. The western extreme is approximately 116° W, on the far side of the Moon. The northern part of the range lies just to the south of the lunar equator, while the southern extent reaches about 38° S. The inner face of the range is distinguished by an uneven, ring-shaped plain surrounding the Montes Rook, while the outer extent apparently consists of a wide blanket of ejecta features deposited during the formation of the Mare Orientale. These have formed various ridges and valleys radial to the mare, and have heavily modified nearby pre-existing crater formations.

Along the inner side of the range to the northeast is a small lunar mare feature named the Lacus Autumni, or Autumn Lake. To the northeast of the range here is the crater pair of Schlüter and Hartwig. The latter crater has been significantly modified by ejecta from Mare Orientale, while the former is a younger feature formed after this supposed impact.

The southeastern portion of the range contains the craters Krasnov and Shaler. To the southeast of the latter formation is a radial valley formation named the Vallis Bouvard. Further to the south and east are another pair of radial valleys named the Vallis Baade and Vallis Inghirami. A similar radial valley, Vallis Bohr, lies to the north of the Montes Cordillera, to the west of the crater Bohr.

The name Cordillera means a chain of mountains in the Spanish language.

References

Cordillera, Montes